The UCF Knights women's volleyball program represents the University of Central Florida in National Collegiate Athletics Association (NCAA) Division I. The Knights compete in the American Athletic Conference (The American) and play their home games on UCF's main campus in Orlando, Florida at The Venue at UCF. The Knights are currently led by head coach Todd Dagenais.

History
The Knights volleyball program began in 1975 under Lucy McDaniel, who would lead the team through the 1979 season. The Knights went 30–8–0 in their inaugural year. The highlight of McDaniel's tenure at UCF, and the women's volleyball program, was their 1978 perfect 55–0 season in which they won the Division II AIAW National Championship.

In 1982, the team joined their first conference, the Sunshine State Conference, which they left following the 1983 season. The program was a member of the New South Women's Athletic Conference (NSWAC) from 1985 to 1989. The Knights then joined the American South Conference in 1990, and spent 1991 in the Sun Belt Conference. In 1993, the Knights joined the Atlantic Sun Conference, where they remained until joining Conference USA in 2005. In 2013, UCF joined the American Athletic Conference.

Coaches

Seasons

<small>

See also

UCF Knights
History of the University of Central Florida
List of University of Central Florida alumni
List of NCAA Division I women's volleyball programs

References

External links

 

 
Volleyball clubs established in 1975
1975 establishments in Florida